The Princeton–Rutgers rivalry is a college rivalry in athletics between the Tigers of Princeton University and Scarlet Knights of Rutgers University – New Brunswick, both of which are located in New Jersey. The rivalry dates back to the first college football game in history in 1869. Although the football series ended in 1980 due to the two schools going in different directions with their football programs, the rivalry has continued in other sports, primarily in men's basketball.

Background
Princeton and Rutgers are among the Colonial colleges, the nine institutions of higher education founded in the Thirteen Colonies before the American Revolution. Princeton was founded in 1746 as the College of New Jersey before being renamed Princeton University in 1896. Rutgers was founded in 1766 as Queen's College and became Rutgers College in 1825. Rutgers won land-grant status in 1864 under the Morrill Act.

Because the two schools are nearly 17 miles apart along U.S. Route 1, the rivalry between Princeton and Rutgers is sometimes known as the "Route 1 Rivalry".

Football

Rutgers declares itself the "birthplace of college football" in memory of the November 6, 1869 game between Princeton (then the College of New Jersey) and Rutgers, the first college football game ever played. Rutgers won 6–4. However, that game was played using rugby rules, in contrast to the 1875 game between Harvard and Tufts that is considered to be the first college football game played using modern rules.

From 1869 to 1980, Princeton and Rutgers played each other 71 times, with Princeton leading the all-time series 53–17–1. In this series, 13 games were played at Rutgers and 57 at Princeton.

As Rutgers invested more resources in its football program in the 1970s in hopes of raising its national prominence, Rutgers dropped Princeton from its 1983 schedule to make room for a stronger opponent. For that reason, Princeton Alumni Weekly speculated in 1977 that the Princeton–Rutgers football series could end in the next decade. In January 1979, Princeton and Rutgers announced the end of their football series "at the request of Princeton officials, who felt that Rutgers' step toward big‐time football in recent seasons had taken the Scarlet Knights out of the Tigers' desired class of competition." After the 1981 season, Princeton football and other Ivy League football programs dropped from Division I-A (now FBS) to Division I-AA (now FCS), due to new NCAA attendance and seating capacity requirements that half of Ivy teams could not meet. In contrast, Rutgers remained in Division I-A.

Game results

Men's basketball

As of the 2016–17 season, Rutgers is Princeton's most-played out-of-conference opponent. In a series dating back to the 1916–17 season and last played in the 2013–14 season, Princeton has a 75–45 series lead.

The Princeton Tigers men's basketball began varsity competition in the 1900–01 season, and the Rutgers Scarlet Knights men's basketball team began competition in basketball in the 1906–07 season as the Queensmen, before the mascot became the Scarlet Knights effective in the 1955–56 season. Their first head-to-head matchup was on February 22, 1917, a 36–17 win for Princeton. The series continued through the 1919–20 season and went on hiatus before resuming for the 1922–23 season then was played annually from the 1926–27 through 1994–95 seasons.

The February 2, 1976 Princeton–Rutgers matchup had an Associated Press 15th-ranked Princeton hosting a fifth-ranked Rutgers in Jadwin Gym. In its recap of the game, The New York Times described the Princeton offense: "Down by only 2 points with 11½ minutes to go, Coach Pete Carril of Princeton ordered a weaving, ballhandling slowdown to kill time and set up perfect shots." In contrast, Rutgers played a more uptempo offense under head coach Tom Young. Then on a 16-game winning streak, Rutgers won 75–62 before a sellout crowd of 7,556, the first sellout at Jadwin in four years.

The two teams would meet again on March 13, 1976 at the Providence Civic Center in Providence, Rhode Island, in the first round of the NCAA Tournament. Down 10 early in the second half, Princeton rallied to pull within 54–53 with four seconds remaining, when Eddie Jordan of Rutgers fouled Princeton reserve guard Pete Molloy. Rutgers coach Tom Young called two timeouts before Molloy attempted the front end of the one-and-one free throws. Molloy missed, and Rutgers guard Mike Dabney grabbed the rebound to secure the 54–53 win. Rutgers advanced to the Final Four round, in which Michigan snapped the Scarlet Knights' 30-game winning streak. Jordan went on to play in the NBA and served as Rutgers head coach from 2013 to 2016.

Due to scheduling problems related to Rutgers moving from the Atlantic 10 Conference to the Big East Conference, the series went on hiatus for the 1995–96 season. The series resumed in the 1996–97 season and continued to be played annually through the 2013–14 season. Princeton beat Rutgers 78–73 at the Louis Brown Athletic Center on December 11, 2013 in a game that The Trentonian dubbed the "battle for New Jersey."

On March 30, 2014, the Home News Tribune reported that Princeton and Rutgers would not play each other in the upcoming season and that Princeton coach Mitch Henderson expressed hope that the series would resume in the near future. The series was also not played in the 2015–16 season.

In 2016, Rutgers hired Steve Pikiell as head coach after firing Jordan. Asbury Park Press columnist Jerry Carino wrote: "There is hope that Rutgers’ hiring of Steve Pikiell...will open the door for Princeton." Carino also added: "As for Rutgers, it’s a bad look for the state university to dodge a century-old rival because they beat you a couple of times." Ultimately, the series was not scheduled in the 2016–17 season.

Game results
Winning team is shown. Ranking of the team at the time of the game by the AP poll is shown by the team name.

Men's lacrosse

The two schools share a historically significant rivalry in men's lacrosse. The series is the seventh longest continuous intercollegiate lacrosse rivalry in the nation, with 98 meetings through 2020. The programs compete for the Meistrell Cup, named after Hall of Famer Harland (Tots) Meistrell, who helped restart the lacrosse teams at both schools in the 1920s. Princeton had disbanded its team in 1894 before its resumption in 1920, while Rutgers discontinued its program in 1889, before its 1920 revival. Current Tigers head coach Matt Madalon described the consistently exciting nature of the series prior to the 2020 meeting as "“The Princeton-Rutgers game has always been a great game, a good rivalry. [We’re] two extremely competitive programs at crucial points in [our] seasons, and we expect another very tight game.”

The series began on May 20, 1922 and ended with the Tigers victorious by a 6–1 margin. Princeton would dominate the early years of the rivalry, including a 17–0 pounding of the Scarlet Knights in 1942.  In 1981, Rutgers downed the Tigers after four overtime periods, the longest game in Scarlet Knights program history. From the 1960s to late 1980s the series was relatively even, but beginning in 1990, Princeton would win the first of 15 straight meetings as the Tigers dominated the national stage. Princeton won six national championships during this period. The teams would meet in the postseason in 2004, with #6 Princeton defeating the Scarlet Knights by a score of 12 to 4 in the first round of the tournament. In 2005, Rutgers would snap the streak and get revenge for the tourney loss with an 8 to 5 victory. In the past few years, the teams have split the last four games, with the Tigers winning the most recent by a score of 16–11 in 2022. After the 99th meeting, Princeton leads the annual series by a count of 65–31–3.

Game results
Princeton rankings are accurate from 2003 to present; Rutgers rankings are accurate from 2015 to present.

Other sports
Women's basketball

The Princeton Tigers women's basketball team began varsity competition in the 1971–72 season, and the Rutgers Scarlet Knights women's basketball team began varsity competition in the 1974–75 season. The first meeting in women's basketball between Princeton and Rutgers was on December 17, 1974, a 76–60 Rutgers win. Rutgers has a 17–5 lead in the series, which was most recently played on December 13, 2017 with a 70–50 Rutgers win in Piscataway.

Men's soccer

Princeton has a 29–20–9 lead over Rutgers in men's soccer as of 2016 in a series dating back to 1942. Princeton has competed in men's soccer since 1909, nearly three decades before Rutgers launched its program in 1938.

Women's soccer

Rutgers has an 18–10–3 lead over Princeton in the all-time series, first played in 1980 and last in 2015.

Princeton hosted Rutgers in the second round of the 2001 College Cup on November 18, 2001; Rutgers won 1–0. Carli Lloyd of Rutgers, a future member of the US national team, scored the lone goal and broke the single-season scoring record for Rutgers. Earlier in the season, Princeton beat Rutgers at Rutgers 2–1 at Yurcak Field on October 2, 2001.

Women's volleyball

As of the 2016 season, Rutgers has a 20–14 series lead over Princeton in women's volleyball, dating back to 1977. Since 2010, Princeton has faced Rutgers five times in the Rutgers Invitational and won the tournament in 2015 and 2016.

Baseball

The first Princeton–Rutgers baseball game was in 1866, with Princeton winning 40–2. Rutgers has a 77–73–3 lead in the all-time series, which was last played on April 3, 2012 when Rutgers won 12–11 at home on Bainton Field. Nick Favatella hit a walk-off home run in the bottom of the ninth inning to win that game for Rutgers.

Softball

Rutgers softball began varsity competition in 1975; Princeton softball began in 1982. Princeton has a 31–24 series lead over Rutgers; the series began in 1985 and was last played in 2015.

Wrestling

The Rutgers-Princeton wrestling rivalry dates back to the Scarlet Knights' first season in 1931. The winner takes home the B1G-Ivy Rivalry Trophy. Rutgers leads the all-time series 45-34-5.

See also  
 List of NCAA college football rivalry games
 Rutgers–Princeton Cannon War

References

College football rivalries in the United States
College basketball rivalries in the United States
College lacrosse rivalries in the United States
Rutgers Scarlet Knights football
Princeton Tigers men's basketball
Rutgers Scarlet Knights men's basketball
Princeton Tigers women's basketball
Rutgers Scarlet Knights women's basketball
Princeton Tigers men's lacrosse
1869 establishments in New Jersey